Events from the year 1998 in Belgium

Incumbents
Monarch: Albert II
Prime Minister: Jean-Luc Dehaene

Events
 23 April – Marc Dutroux briefly escapes from custody

Publications

Births

Deaths
 2 October – Olivier Gendebien (born 1924), racing driver

References

 
Belgium
Years of the 20th century in Belgium
1990s in Belgium
Belgium